Words of Truth is Jamaican reggae singer Sizzla's ninth album. It was released on VP Records on August 29, 2000, and contains a bonus live CD recorded at the Brixton Academy. All songs are written by Sizzla, and produced by Xterminator's Philip "Fatis" Burrell, musicians on the album include Sly Dunbar and Dean Fraser.

Track listing

Disc 1
"Lift my Eyes" - 3:58
"Enemies are Confounded" - 3:45
"Think Positive" - 3:31
"Love, Love" - 3:32
"Every Move that I make" - 3:41
"Attack" - 3:37
"Words of Truth" - 3:29
"Powers of the Earth" - 3:38
"Them no Good" - 3:43
"Love ah di Way" - 3:42
"Uplift Your Standard" - 3:59
"Praise" - 3:44
"Step up" - 3:41
"Gimmie Love" - 3:52

Disc 2
"Praise Ye Jah" - 3:38
"One Away" - 2:36
"Holding firm" - 2:03
"Ancient Memories" - 1:33
"Words of Devine" - 3::33
"Dem ah Wonder" - 3:58
"Guide over Us" - 3:42
"Make dem Secure" - 2:20
"Babylon ah Listen" - 1:48
"Humble Thought" - 2:59
"Black Woman & Child" - 3:21
"Give dem ah Ride" - 5:19

Credits
 Winston Bowen - guitar
 Ian Coleman - guitar
 Paul "Wrong Move" Crossdale - keyboards
 Paul Daley - engineer
 Donald Dennis - bass, piano, drums, keyboards
 Sly Dunbar - drums
 Jea Edman - photography
 Dean Fraser - saxophone
 Leba - backing vocals
 Robert Lyn - lyricist
 David Madden - horn
 Garfield McDonald - engineer, mixing
 Chris Meredith - bass, keyboards
 Christopher Meredith - bass, keyboards
 J. Miller - drums
 Mr. Chung - artwork
 Robert Murphy - engineer, mixing
 Nambo - horn
 Sherida - backing vocals
 Skoolaz - mixing
 Earl "Chinna" Smith - guitar
 Fabian Smith - keyboards
 Steven Stanley - keyboards, mixing

References

External links
 [ Review] at Allmusic
 Sizzla's website
 VP website

2000 albums
Sizzla albums